Daşoguz (also Dashoguz, Dasoguz; roughly "stone spring" in Turkmen), formerly known as Tashauz (until 1992) and Dashkhovuz (1992–1999), is a city in northern Turkmenistan and the capital of Daşoguz Province. The Uzbekistan border is about 10 km away.

Geography
It is located at latitude 41.833° north, longitude 59.9667° east, at an average of 88 meters above sea level. In nearby Lake Sarykamysh 65 varieties of fish can be found.

Climate
Daşoguz has a cold desert climate (BWk, according to the Köppen climate classification), with long and hot summers. Winters are relatively short, but quite cold. The precipitation is scarce throughout the year, with an average of 100 mm (3.93 in).

History
Founded as a fort called Tashauz in the early 19th century by the Russians, the name was changed to the Turkmen form Dashkhovuz in 1992 after independence, and to Daşoguz by order of President Niyazov in 1999; the modern city has all characteristics of Soviet planning. The etymology remains disputed.

On September 5, 1998, an H5 meteorite weighing approximately 7 kilograms fell in Daşoguz.

City 
Along the middle of the town runs the Saparmurat Turkmenbashy Shayoly, formerly Andalyp Shayoly in honor of Andalyp, a native poet c. 18th century. 

A pentad of statues—Oguzhan, Görogly, Gorkut Ata, Tughril, Alp Arslan and Magtymguly Pyragy surrounding a seated Saparmurat Niyazov, who is reading Ruhnama—ornament the town center. Two museums —Museum of Bagshies, commemorating native traditional singers and Glory Museum, commemorating local war heroes — are prominent.

Transportation
Paul Brummell notes that the town serves as a transportation hub rather than a tourist destination. Daşoguz Airport provides regular flights to Ashgabat and Turkmenbashy. At the city's northern edge lies the railway station, from which a daily train operates to and from Ashgabat. Private vehicles are available for transport to all district capitals in the Northern Region, and Ashgabat.

Demographics
Daşoguz's population of 166,500 (1999 census estimate) is predominantly Turkmen and Uzbek, with smaller numbers of Russians, Koreans, Karakalpaks, and Tatars present. A large number of those forcefully displaced by ex-President for Life Saparmurat Niyazov have been resettled in lands adjoining the town.

Notable people
Yagshygeldi Kakayev (1959–2020) - politician and petroleum engineer

Sport 
The town has a 2 stadiums: Sport Toplumy Stadium and Garaşsyzlyk Stadium.

References

External links 

Populated places in Daşoguz Region